Gastón Monzón (born May 13, 1987 in Buenos Aires) is an Argentine football goalkeeper.

Career
A native of Buenos Aires, Monzón (also known as Torta) began playing football with local side Club Atlético Huracán. He was the club's primary goalkeeper from 2007 to 2014. A move to San Marcos de Arica in Chile that was marred by injury followed.

After he retired from playing, Monzón became a goalkeeping coach. He made a surprise Primera B Metropolitana appearance for Club Atlético Fénix during the 2022 tournament, when the club's starting and reserve goalkeepers were unavailable due to injury. Club Comunicaciones capitalized on a Monzón error en route to a 2-1 victory over Fénix.

References

External links
 Gastón Monzón at BDFA.com.ar 
 Gastón Monzón - Argentine Primera Statistics at Fútbol XXI  
 Gastón Monzón at Soccerway

1987 births
Living people
Footballers from Buenos Aires
Association football goalkeepers
Argentine footballers
Argentine expatriate footballers
Club Atlético Huracán footballers
San Marcos de Arica footballers
CSyD Tristán Suárez footballers
Deportivo Armenio footballers
CA Excursionistas players
General Lamadrid footballers
San Martín de Burzaco footballers
Chilean Primera División players
Argentine Primera División players
Primera Nacional players
Argentine expatriate sportspeople in Chile
Expatriate footballers in Chile